Lowell Arthur Cowell (October 10, 1945 - November 12, 2018) was a NASCAR Winston Cup Series driver. He drove in ten total Winston Cup races from 1981 to 1983.

Racing career
Debuting in the NASCAR Winston Cup Series in 1981, Cowell drove four races for Roger Hamby, having a best finish of 17th at Texas World Speedway. He drove in five races for Hamby, including the Daytona 500, in 1982, scoring a best finish of 13th in the return trip to Daytona in summer. Cowell attempted the 1983 Daytona 500 with Cecil Gordon, but failed to qualify. He later ran the 1983 Winston 500 with Mike Potter, finishing 26th after an engine failure. Cowell's last NASCAR attempt was the 1984 Daytona 500 with Potter, where he failed to qualify.

Personal life
Cowell was a 1963 graduate of Clay-Batelle Middle/High School. He was also an entrepreneur, owning various small businesses throughout his life. Cowell married Jacqualine Wilson and they had three kids.

Motorsports career results

NASCAR

Winston Cup Series

Daytona 500

References

1945 births
NASCAR drivers
Racing drivers from West Virginia
2018 deaths